Canadian aboriginal may refer to:
 Aboriginal peoples in Canada
 Canadian Aboriginal syllabics, a script

See also
 Unified Canadian Aboriginal Syllabics (Unicode block)